Marinella gia panta (Greek: Μαρινέλλα για πάντα) is the name of a studio album by popular Greek singer Marinella. It was released in 1974 by PolyGram Records in Cyprus.

Track listing 

Side One.
 "Ola ine tichera (Tout est un question de chance)" (Όλα είναι τυχερά; It's a matter of luck) – (Stavros Xarchakos - Nikos Gatsos)
 This song had been recorded in 1972 and released as a single in 1973 only in France. A live version appears on Mia Vradia Me Tin Marinella No. 2.
 "Ke tora" (Και τώρα; And now) – (Mimis Plessas - Ilias Lymperopoulos)
 This song had been released as a single on 19 January 1973.
 "Pallikari mou" (Παλικάρι μου; My gallant man) – (Stavros Xarchakos - Nikos Gatsos)
 This song had been released on Mia Vradia Me Tin Marinella No. 2.
 "Aspro mou rodo" (Άσπρο μου ρόδο; My white rose) – (Christos Leontis - Takis Michailidis)
 This song had been recorded in 1971 and released on 12 Para Pente.
 "Tin ora pou stamatise i vrochi" (Την ώρα που σταμάτησε η βροχή; When the rain stopped) – (Mimis Plessas - Ilias Lymperopoulos)
 This song had been released as a single on 7 July 1972.
 "Pou pane ekina ta pedia (My reason)" (Πού πάνε εκείνα τα παιδιά; Where are going those young men?) – (Stélios Vlavianós - Charis Chalkitis - Pythagoras)
 This song had been recorded in 1972 and released as a single on 17 January 1973.
Side Two.
 "Drigi, drigi, mana mou (Velvet mornings)" (Ντρίγκι, ντρίγκι, μάνα μου; Drigi, drigi, my mother) – (Stélios Vlavianós - Robert Constandinos - Pythagoras)
 This song had been recorded in 1972 and released as a single on 17 January 1973. A live version appears on Mia Vradia Me Tin Marinella No. 2.
 "Den pirazi, de variese" (Δεν πειράζει, δε βαριέσαι; Never mind, it doesn't matter) – (Mimis Plessas - Ilias Lymperopoulos)
 This song had been released as a single on 19 January 1973.
 "Derbenterissa" (Ντερμπεντέρισσα; Straight talking woman) – (Vassilis Tsitsanis - Nikos Routsos)
 This song had been released on Athanata Rebetika. A live version appears on Mia Vradia Me Tin Marinella No. 2
 "Thessaloniki mou" (Θεσσαλονίκη μου; My Thessaloniki) – (Manolis Chiotis - Christos Kolokotronis)
 This song had been released on Athanata Rebetika.
 "De me stefanonese" (Δε με στεφανώνεσαι; You don't marry me) – (Vassilis Tsitsanis)
 This song had been released on Athanata Rebetika. A live version appears on Mia Vradia Me Tin Marinella No. 2.
 "Mi lighisete pedia (Liberté)" (Μη λυγίσετε παιδιά; Don't bend children) – (Stavros Xarchakos - Nikos Gatsos)
 This song had been recorded in 1972 and released as a single in 1973 only in France.

Personnel 
 Marinella - vocals, background vocals
 Marios Kostoglou - background vocals on tracks 10 and 11
 Mimis Plessas - arranger and conductor on tracks 2, 5, 8, 9, 10 and 11
 Stavros Xarchakos - arranger and conductor on tracks 1 and 12
 Christos Leontis - arranger and conductor on "Aspro mou rodo"
 Haris Kaleas - arranger and conductor on tracks 6 and 7
 Philippos Papatheodorou - producer 
 Yiannis Smyrneos - recording engineer

References

1974 albums
Marinella albums
Greek-language albums
Universal Music Greece albums